Leïla Maatouk (born 24 October 1981) is an Algerian former footballer who played as a defender. She has been a member of the Algeria women's national team.

Club career
Maatouk has played for Affak Relizane in Algeria.

International career
Maatouk capped for Algeria at senior level during the 2010 African Women's Championship.

References

1981 births
Living people
Algerian women's footballers
Women's association football defenders
Algeria women's international footballers
21st-century Algerian people